Katalin Marosi (born 12 November 1979) is a Hungarian former professional tennis player.

In her career, Marosi won 15 singles and 31 doubles titles on the ITF Women's Circuit. On 8 May 2000, she reached her best singles ranking of world No. 101. On 6 May 2013, she peaked at No. 33 in the doubles rankings.

Playing for Hungary Fed Cup team, Marosi has a win–loss record of 15–13.

Early life
Her mother Ildiko is a secretary, her father Sandor a gymnastics trainer; she has one older brother (Peter). Marosi was introduced to tennis at age six by Antal and Eva Elekes in Budapest. Favorite surface of the all-court player was hardcourt, favorite shot forehand. Best memories include warming-up her serve with Steffi Graf in 1996 Roland Garros juniors, and winning her first ITF event. Marosi admired Graf because she knew everything about tennis and was so good mentally.

WTA career finals

Doubles: 3 (3 runner-ups)

ITF Circuit finals

Singles: 22 (15 titles, 7 runner-ups)

Doubles: 55 (31 titles, 24 runner-ups)

Grand Slam performance timelines

Singles

Doubles

References

External links
 
 
 

1979 births
Living people
People from Gheorgheni
Hungarian female tennis players
Tennis players at the 2000 Summer Olympics
Olympic tennis players of Hungary
20th-century Hungarian women
21st-century Hungarian women